CFCM-DT, virtual channel 4.1 (UHF digital channel 17), is a TVA owned-and-operated television station licensed to Quebec City, Quebec, Canada. The station is owned by the Groupe TVA subsidiary of Quebecor Media. CFCM-DT's studios are located on de l'Exposition Street near the Videotron Centre in the Quebec City borough of La Cité-Limoilou, and its transmitter is located at its former studios on Myrand Street in the former suburb of Sainte-Foy. On cable, the station is available on Vidéotron channel 4 and in high definition on digital channel 604.

Until 2011, the station's transmitter facilities previously also hosted the transmitter for CBVE-TV (channel 5), the now-defunct local rebroadcaster of Montreal's CBMT-DT, when that station relocated to CBVT-DT's former analogue channel (VHF channel 11), which broadcasts from Mount Bélair.

History
CFCM was Quebec's first private television station, going on the air for the first time on July 17, 1954. The transmitter building and studios was located on St. Jean Boscoe Street, near Cite Universitaire. A 440-foot-tall lattice tower was built for the stations transmitter which gave the station a 50 mile coverage radius.
CFCM started out as a private bilingual CBC/Radio-Canada affiliate. The station's original owner was Télévision de Québec, a consortium of theatre chain Famous Players and Quebec City's two private AM radio stations, CHRC and CKCV.

At its launch, CFCM immediately linked up with both the CBC and Radio-Canada microwave networks. The station started broadcasting an all-French service on March 17, 1957, when Télévision de Québec launched CKMI-TV. When Radio-Canada opened CBVT on September 7, 1964, CFCM joined the loose association of independent stations formed by Montreal's CFTM-TV and Chicoutimi's CJPM-TV a year earlier. This was the forerunner of TVA, which was formally organized on September 12, 1971.

Télévision de Québec was nearly forced to sell its stations in 1969 because of the Canadian Radio-television and Telecommunications Commission's new rules requiring television stations to be 80 percent Canadian-owned. The largest shareholder, Famous Players, was a subsidiary of American film studio Paramount Pictures (Paramount and parent company Viacom, later ViacomCBS and now its namesake Paramount Global, eventually sold Famous Players to rival Cineplex Entertainment in 2005). Eventually, Famous Players reduced its shares to 20% by 1971, allowing Télévision de Québec to keep CKMI and CFCM The company renamed itself Télé-Capitale in 1974.

For most of the time from the 1970s through the 2000s, it was known on-air as "Télé-4" (TV-4).

CFCM, along with five other stations, CKMI-TV, CHLT-TV, CHEM-TV and CFER-TV, were all purchased by Pathonic Communications in 1979. CFCM became the flagship station of Pathonic's new TVA-affiliated system.

Pathonic merged with Télé-Metropole, owner of CFTM, in 1990. Since then, CFCM has been a semi-satellite of CFTM, except for newscasts.

As of October 2022, CFCM airs a local 10-minute bulletin within the network's noon newscast, as well as two 30-minute bulletins at 5:30 and 6:00 p.m.

Digital television
In August 2011, CFCM-DT signed on the air.

With the use of PSIP, digital television receivers will list CFCM-DT's virtual channel as 4.1.

References

External links
TVA Québec

FCM
Television channels and stations established in 1954
FCM
1954 establishments in Quebec